Metropolis – The Grandmaster Recordings is an album by Norwegian rock band Seigmen. It is the English-language version of the album Metropolis. The album came in three editions. One in a jewel case, one a digipack with poster, and one vinyl. The name "The Grandmaster Recordings" refers to Grandmaster Studios in Los Angeles, where the band recorded with American producer Sylvia Massy.

Track listing
 "Give" – 6:50 ("Metropolis")
 "Gold" - 4:42 ("Slaver Av Solen")
 "Mesmerize" - 4:50 ("Juvel")
 "Bayon" - 5:28 ("Bayon")
 "The Circus" - 2:58 ("Circus")
 "Twinflower" - 4:17 ("Regn")
 "Octopus" - 3:06
 "Mother Earth" - 5:07 ("Nihil")
 "Spellbinder" - 3:05 ("Rød Himmel")
 "The Man with the Golden Helmet" - 6:07 ("Sort Disippel")
 "Television Kisses" - 2:04
 "Nemesis" - 6:52 ("Nemesis")
 "In Oblivion" - 6:07
 "Spellbinder Part 2" - 3:01 ("Epilog" - bonus on LP release)

Names in brackets are the equivalent songs on the original Norwegian version. There are also three new songs, and on the LP release there is an additional song - "Spellbinder Part 2" which is exactly the same track as "Epilog" on the Norwegian edition.

Personnel
Alex Møklebust - Lead vocals
Kim Ljung - Bass guitar, vocals
Noralf Ronthi - drums
Marius Roth Christensen - Electric guitar
Sverre Økshoff - Electric guitar

1996 albums
Seigmen albums